The Mysore–Dharwad Express is an Express train belonging to South Western Railway zone that runs between Dharwad railway station and  in India. It is currently being operated with 17301/17302 train numbers on daily basis.

Route 

The train travels through Mysore Junction, Dharwad.

Schedule

See also 

 Mysore Junction railway station
 Dharwad railway station
 Vishwamanava Express

References

External links 

 17301/Mysuru–Dharwad Express
 17302/Dharwad–Mysuru Express

Transport in Mysore
Transport in Hubli-Dharwad
Rail transport in Dharwad
Express trains in India
Rail transport in Karnataka
Railway services introduced in 2004